Noura Mohamed (born 5 March 1998) is an Egyptian fencer. She competed in the women's foil event at the 2016 Summer Olympics, losing her only match. She also represented Egypt at the 2020 Summer Olympics held in Tokyo, Japan.

She competed at the 2018 African Fencing Championships, winning a bronze medal.

References

External links
 

1998 births
Living people
Egyptian female foil fencers
Olympic fencers of Egypt
Fencers at the 2016 Summer Olympics
Place of birth missing (living people)
Fencers at the 2020 Summer Olympics